Edwardsiella is a genus of gram-negative, fermentative bacteria of the family Hafniaceae.  It was first discovered in snakes in 1962.

Description
A genus of gram-negative, facultatively anaerobic, rod-shaped bacteria of the family Hafniaceae, they are occasionally opportunistic pathogens of humans.

Species
Notable species include: 
 Edwardsiella hoshinae, a motile species that, isolated from animals and humans, does not produce indole.
 Edwardsiella ictaluri, a nonmotile species that does not produce indole, and occurs as a pathogen of catfish.
 Edwardsiella tarda, also known as Edwardsiella anguillimortifera, a species which produces indole, is biochemically similar to Escherichia coli. It is  usually found in aquatic animals and reptiles, and is found in the intestinal tract of snakes and seals. It is occasionally isolated from the urine, blood, and faeces of humans, and has been known to cause gastroenteritis and wound infections. In India, it has been found in children with diarrhoea.

References

Enterobacterales
Bacteria genera